Escape from Scorpion Island is a BBC children's TV adventure game show in which contestants try to 'escape from an exotic island with a mind of its own' by doing various challenges to improve their chances of escaping. Series 1 was made by RDF Television for CBBC and was filmed in Brazil, while series 2 onwards were produced by Foundation/Freehand for CBBC and ABC Television and were filmed in Australia.

The show has been presented by 3 different sets of presenters; Caroline Flack and Reggie Yates (series 1), JK and Joel (series 2–3) and Myleene Klass and Johny Pitts (series 4–5). The show ran for five series across four years before being cancelled in 2011 following the end of BBC's and ABC's partnership.

Format
A number of adventurers, aged 11–14 and from either the UK or Australia, are brought to a fictional island called 'Scorpion Island', a tropical and exotic island that appears to have a mind of its own. Once on the island the adventurers are divided into two teams, usually either 'Team Sting' or 'Team Claw', though series 3 featured a third team called 'Team Venom', and for the first half of series 5 the teams were boys vs girls. The number of adventures on each team are usually fixed, though a team may lose, gain and swap members as the show goes on, depending on the series. The ultimate goal of each series for each team is to escape the island, so along the way the teams compete in various challenges to better their chances of escaping the island. Whoever wins the final challenge escapes the island while the losing team(s) are left behind.

The show has been filmed in a variety of different locations and each series introduces different challenges and storylines. The challenges were usually a mix of both mental challenges and main physical challenges, and the challenges are done in either small teams or individually. Sometimes a team who is successful in the first challenge gets an advantage in the following challenge, such as a time bonus. Examples of the challenges faced throughout are:
 Transporting certain objects from one area to another while suspended in the air on wires
 Climbing/abseiling down a rock or cliff-face
 Completing a large jigsaw puzzle 
 Collecting objects/running down an assault course
 Driving an off-road buggy around a track
 Swimming down a river or area of water while collecting objects
 Filling a funnel with water so the object floats to the top
 Assembling a raft and then paddling 
 Throwing an object at a target to score the most
 Pulling objects up a hill with ropes
 Various mental and arithmetic puzzles

The final escape consisted of bigger, more tougher challenges done in multiple stages where everyone on each team is involved, and whoever wins each stage would get an advantage in the following stage and so on until the final round where the winning team escape the island.

Series overview

Series 1 (2007)

The first series ran on BBC One from 3 September 2007 to 21 September 2007 and was presented by Caroline Flack and Reggie Yates and filmed in Fernando de Noronha, Brazil.

10 Adventurers
3 Weeks
1 Island

Series 2 (2008)

Series Two premiered on 28 September 2008 on BBC Two and on 3 November 2008 on ABC1. It was hosted by JK and Joel and was filmed in Mission Beach, Queensland, Australia in 2008.

1 Island
2 Teams (Sting and Claw)
10 Captives

Series 3 (2009)

Series Three premiered on 5 April 2009 on CBBC and on 9 March 2009 on ABC1. It was hosted by JK and Joel and was filmed in Mission Beach, Queensland, Australia in 2008.

16 Adventurers
3 Teams (Sting, Claw and Venom)
1 Island

Series 4 (2010)

Series Four premiered on 9 August 2010 on CBBC, and on 13 October on ABC3. It was hosted by Myleene Klass and Johny Pitts and was filmed in Tallebudgera Valley, Queensland, Australia in April 2010.

10 Adventurers
5 Powers (Balance, Bravery, Speed, Strength and Stamina)
1 Island

Series 5 (2011)

Series Five premiered on 11 March 2011 on ABC3. It was hosted by Myleene Klass and Johny Pitts and was filmed in Tallebudgera Valley, Queensland, Australia in April 2010. The series premiered on BBC 2 on 16:05 on 20 May 2011 and concluded on 25 July.

10 Adventurers
2 Teams (Originally – Boys and Girls) (Final – Sting and Claw)
1 Island

See also
 Endurance – A similar American Reality Competition series.

References

External links 
 
 

2007 British television series debuts
2011 British television series endings
2000s British children's television series
2010s British children's television series
2000s British game shows
2010s British game shows
BBC children's television shows
British children's game shows
English-language television shows
Television series about children
Television series about teenagers
Television series by Banijay